Friginatica amphiala is a species of small deepwater sea snail, a marine gastropod mollusc in the family Naticidae.

References
 Powell A. W. B., New Zealand Mollusca, William Collins Publishers Ltd, Auckland, New Zealand 1979 

Naticidae
Gastropods of New Zealand
Gastropods described in 1881